The Machine That Won the War is the sixth release by Sheavy. It was released in 2007 on Candlelight Records. The album was released with a limited edition live DVD produced by Studio 709 featuring footage that was shot on March 3 at the Holy Heart Auditorium in St. John's. The cover artwork was created by Eliran Kantor.

Track ending
"The Sleeping Assassin" - 2:49
"Demon Soldiers" - 3:39
"Humanoid" - 3:51
"Dawn of the Black Orchid" - 3:56
"Aboard the Mothership" - 3:14
"Rings of Saturn" - 2:44
"Here Falls the Shadow" - 4:10
"Lords of Radiation" - 3:01
"The Dark Carnival" - 3:43
"Where Earth Meets Sky" - 4:17
"One of Us Must Be Dead" - 3:26
"The Gunfighters" - 4:22

2007 albums
Albums with cover art by Eliran Kantor
Sheavy albums